Première Nation des Innus de Nutashkuan (French: Montagnais de Natashquan, Montagnais of Natashquan or Nutashkuan Innu First Nation) is an Innu First Nations band government in Quebec, Canada. The band lives on Nutashkuan, an Indian reserve in the Côte-Nord region. , they have a registered population of 1,217 members. They are part of the Regroupement Mamit Innuat tribal council.

Demographics 
Members of the Natashquan First Nation are Innu, also called Montagnais. , the band has a total registered population of 1,217 members, 117 of whom lived off the reserve. Statistics Canada's 2016 Canadian census found 835 people living on the reserve which was down slightly (0.7%) from the 841 people found on the 2011 Census.

Geography 
Montagnais of Natashquan owns one reserve, Nutashkuan located in the Côte-Nord region of Quebec close to the municipality of Natashquan. The reserve is at the mouth of the Natashquan River on the northern coast of the Gulf of St. Lawrence. The band is also served by Natashquan Airport.

References 

Innu
Côte-Nord
First Nations governments
First Nations in Quebec